The name Paul has been used for eleven tropical cyclones worldwide:  
In the Eastern Pacific Ocean
 Tropical Storm Paul (1978) – made landfall in western Mexico. 
 Hurricane Paul (1982) – killed over 1,000 in Central America. 
 Tropical Storm Paul (1994) – never threatened land. 
 Tropical Storm Paul (2000) – made landfall in Hawaii as a tropical depression.  
 Hurricane Paul (2006) – made landfall in Mexico as a tropical depression. 
 Hurricane Paul (2012) – threatened Baja California, but weakened before landfall.
 Tropical Storm Paul (2018) – never threatened land.

In the Northwestern Pacific Ocean
 Tropical Storm Paul (1999) (T9908, 12W)

In the Southern Hemisphere
 Cyclone Paul (1980)
 Tropical Cyclone Paul (2000)
 Tropical Cyclone Paul (2010)

Pacific hurricane set index articles
Pacific typhoon set index articles
Australian region cyclone set index articles